First Reformed Church of Astoria was organized and established in 1839 and continues to operate, both as a church and as a center for family and holiday-oriented events.

History 

Although most history behind this church is still unclear, the First Reformed Church of Astoria was organized and established in 1839. According to information within the "Guide to the First Reformed Church of Astoria," the area in which the Church was built was known as Hallet's Cove, prior to 1839. In addition, the Church itself was originally called the Reformed Protestant Dutch Church of the Village of Astoria. The earliest pastors of this church included the Rev. Alexander Hamilton Bishop, Rev. William H. Ten Eyck, and Rev. Matthias L. Haines. The areas in which this Reformed Church, as well as its mission, can be explored include its Baptisms, the marriages that occurred within this Church, the obituaries connected with it, and also how it was maintained in the 20th century.

Baptisms

According to the "Baptismal Register and Membership Register, 1840-1892" in the record entitled "Baptisms: Protestant Reformed Dutch Church of Astoria, L. I.", there were a large number of individuals who were baptized within the First Reformed Church of Astoria; these records can be found within the First Reformed Church of Astoria Records. One of the earliest baptisms that occurred was that of Isabella McConnel, the daughter of Thomas and Mary McConnel, born May 17, 1840 and baptized June 21st of that same year. The daughters of Frederick Lancashire and his wife Elizabeth Pearsall were Ida Elizabeth (born August 10, 1852) and Myra Amelia (born April 22, 1954); both daughters were baptized on January 13, 1854. These names were a few of the many listed under "Records of Baptisms Reformed Church of Astoria" who were baptized by under Ministry of Rev. William H. Ten Eyck. Furthermore, there were baptisms that were bestowed under the ministry and direction of Rev. Matthias L. Haines. For example, Jennie Elgora Pattison, born to Charles/Chas. S. Pattison and Ellen F. Bressey on March 2, 1861, was baptized on July 11, 1874. Additionally, two of Henry S. Crawford's and Elisa S. Mallony's children were Edward Chauncey and Henry Sheen, both of whom were born on April 1, 1873 and baptized on June 11, 1876. One last example of baptisms that occurred within the First Reformed Church of Astoria was that of Christina Evalina, born to Thios McKion and Rebecca Patton on Dec. 25, 1877 and baptized on June 9, 1978.

Marriages

In the "Marriage Records of Reformed Dutch Church of Astoria, Long Island," the First Reformed Church of Astoria was also a significant center for marriage ceremonies. December 16, 1869 marked the marriage of Jesse A. Ellsworth to Phebe Jane Uesserole. For instance, December 16, 1860 marked the marriage of Jesse A. Ellsworth to Phebe Jane Uesserole. Furthermore, several of the founding pastors performed marriage ceremonies within different years: Rev. Haines performed marriages from 1875 to 1885, while Rev. William Stackton Granmer performed marriages from 1885 to 1892. For example, according to the chart/list entitled "Marriages Under the Pastorate of Rev. Matt. L. Haines", Rev. Haines performed the marriage of James William Babcook and Emma E. Merritt on October 31, 1877, with Alfred James Merritt as one of the witnesses. One November 26, 1890, Rev. Granmer married Chas Mayhew Phinny to Anna Aleda Smith.

Obituaries

The First Reformed Church of Astoria was also a place in which funerals were held for the deceased residents of Jamaica. According to an Obituary found within the First Reformed Church of Astoria Records in Central Library, one such person whose funeral was held at the First Reformed Church of Astoria was Cornelius Rapelye, a lifelong and highly respected resident of Astoria. This man was born in the winter residence of the Rapelye Family in the year of 1833. He died at the age of 57 (the same age of his father when he died) on Nov. 20, 1896. The cause of Rapelye's death was a painful ailment he suffered from for some time and he submitted to an operation on the Monday of November 17, 1896 to receive some relief; however, despite everything Professor Wright of New York, along with Doctors Taylor, Trask and Fitch of Astoria, did to save him, Rapelye died on the following Thursday morning.

The funeral services were held at the First Reformed Church of Astoria on Monday, November 24, 1896. A throng of sincere mourners, both rich and poor class, filled the church to pay tribute his memory. The choir was composed of Rapelye's personal friends who were reported to have sung in a very emotional manner.

Future and Maintenance

According to the 1939 article "Old Reformed Church in Astoria Plans For Its 100th Anniversary", the First Reformed Church of Astoria, once fashionable and prosperous, "felt the pangs of a change in character of the neighborhood a decade or more ago" due to a significant decrease or reduction of its members. The Church, in conjunction with 100th Anniversary, was scheduled to re-open and regain its popularity in May 1939, under the spiritual leadership of the Reverend Alfred R. Winham. This article further notes how the church had deteriorated considerably and required improvements, with extensive repairs halted or prevented due to limited financial resources. However, the pastor, assisted by a group of staunch supporters, undertook the task of repairing and re-shaping the edifice roof. The work for this project began under the supervision of Louis J. Falvie. This program included the installation of new copper flushings and gutters. Harry Glover was one church member in a group of 12 who assisted in this project.

On September 11, 1966, Sherwin D. Weener was ordained and bestowed as the new pastor of the First Reformed Church of Astoria. This service was joined by pastors of the First Reformed Church of Long Island City, the Steinway Reformed Church, and the Second Reformed Church of Astoria.

150th Anniversary

In the Fall of 1986, parishioners celebrated the 150th anniversary (150 years after the cornerstone was laid) with special services and guest appearances by two former pastors. This anniversary brought back the Rev. Kenneth Tenckinck, who was pastor from 1970 to 1984 and the Rev. Sherwin Weener, who served from 1965 to 1970, along with several other ministers. The church, although devastated by fire and damaged by lightning, has been preserved.

Special Services and Events

Astoria's First Reformed Church hosted a trilogy of special evangelistic services in 1962, which were spread over three nights: distinguished church leaders attended the events as guest speakers. The Rev. Victor Bucci orchestrated/prepared that Tuesday, June 26, as Children's night in which his church's children choir sang and play-acted a song of the Good Samaritan. On Wednesday, June 27, Youth Night was held; during this event, Bill Reynolds, popular song leaders from Levittown Reformed Church played with his guitar, while the member of the host church's youth choir offered a medley of spirituals and the Youth Choir of Steinway Reformed Church of Astoria presented a program in its turn. And Thursday, June 28, was scheduled as Family Night, in which the senior choir led the singing.

Operation Kids

The church of the First Reformed Church of Astoria launched a project called "Operation Kids." The church itself was situated on 12th Street near Astoria in a high-delinquency area. This was drawn up by the Rev. Victor Bucci, who hoped to "modernize and expand present facilities to keep youngsters busy, and... out of trouble". Rev. Bucci stated, in description of the project, "The building we use adjoining the church is really a makeshift facility" and "hardly adequate for the work we are doing and hope to do. It's over 70 years old and is literally falling apart at the seams." Furthermore, Rev. Bucci stated that even though the facilities seemed dangerous, "it's a choice of either leaving the kids outside on their own or taking them in here and off the streets." Protestant, Catholic, and Jewish youngsters (many from the Astoria Housing Project) crowded into the structure adjoining the church. Rev. Bucci stated Operation Kids would have allowed the church to serve wholesome needs of the community in many consecutive ways; he went on to say "It means that we can expand our completely inter-racial fellowship and rededicate ourselves to the true welfare of all around us. The project required $25,000 in funding.

References

External links
 First Reformed Church of Astoria - official site
 Guide to the First Reformed Church of Astoria Records 1838-1928 Control # F-3, manuscript finding aid. Coll. 149. Archives at the Queens Library, Long Island Division, Queens Borough Public Library

Astoria, Queens
Churches in Queens, New York
Reformed Church in America churches in New York (state)